Jean Carlos Solórzano Madrigal (born 8 January 1988) is a Costa Rican footballer who plays as a forward for Lions FC in the National Premier Leagues Queensland.  On 26 January 2020, he officially became an Australian citizen.

Club career
He made his official debut with the Alajuelense first team during the 2005–06 season, on 14 December, against Santacruceña, with only 17 years, and played 29 minutes for his team.  He was the top scorer for his team in the 2006–07 season, scoring eight goals in 17 games.

Brisbane Roar
It was announced that he had signed with Australian A-League club Brisbane Roar on-loan for a year from Alajuelense. Solorzano impressed at Brisbane, scoring 11 goals. Solorzano went on to win the 2011 A-League Grand Final in stunning fashion against Central Coast Mariners. Solorzano stated that he wanted to stay at the Roar.

Melbourne Victory
It was announced on 28 March 2011 that Melbourne Victory signed Solorzano from Brisbane Roar, with Alajuelense extending his loan deal for one more season so that the move could take place. Solorzano failed to make an impact at Melbourne due to limited game-time, and returned to Costa Rica at the end of the season.

Puntarenas
Solórzano signed with Puntarenas in June 2013.

Return to Brisbane Roar
On 29 January 2014 Solórzano re-signed with the club that he won Premiership and Championship medals with in 2010–11. He has initially signed on until the end of the 2013–14 season following a successful week-long trial. It took him almost a year to score his first Brisbane Roar goals scoring a brace against the Central Coast Mariners. Solórzano then scored 6 goals in his next 7 games.

On 29 April 2016, following an injury-riddled season, Solórzano was released by Brisbane Roar.

Rochedale Rovers
Solórzano joined Rochedale in June 2016, ahead of their FFA Cup match against Redlands United.

St Albans Saints
In January 2017, Solorzano joined St Albans Saints ahead of their 2017 National Premier Leagues Victoria season.

International career
Solórzano has represented Costa Rica at U-17 level, was part of the Costa Rican 2005 FIFA U-17 World Championship squad as well as the 2007 FIFA U-20 World Cup squad.

He made his senior debut for Costa Rica in an April 2012 friendly match against Honduras, coming on as a substitute for Olman Vargas.

Honors

Club
Brisbane Roar:
 A-League Premiership: 2010–2011, 2013–14
 A-League Championship: 2010–2011, 2013–14

Lions FC
 National Premier Leagues Queensland Premiership: 2018
 National Premier Leagues Queensland Championship: 2018

Individual
 A-League PFA Team of the Season: 2010–11

References

External links
 

1988 births
Living people
People from Guanacaste Province
Association football forwards
Costa Rican footballers
Costa Rica international footballers
L.D. Alajuelense footballers
Brisbane Roar FC players
Melbourne Victory FC players
Puntarenas F.C. players
Costa Rican expatriate footballers
Costa Rican expatriate sportspeople in Australia
Expatriate soccer players in Australia
A-League Men players
Liga FPD players
National Premier Leagues players
Costa Rica under-20 international footballers
Costa Rica youth international footballers
Naturalised soccer players of Australia